Thapelo James Morena (born 6 August 1993) is a South African professional soccer player who plays as a defender or midfielder for South African club Mamelodi Sundowns.

Honours
'''Mamelodi Sundowns
South African Premier Division: 2017–18, 2018–19, 2019–20, 2020–21, 2021–22
Nedbank Cup: 2019–20, 2021-22
Telkom Knockout: 2019
MTN 8: 2021

Friendly 
Carling Black Label Cup: 2022

References

1993 births
Living people
South African soccer players
People from Randfontein
Association football utility players
Bloemfontein Celtic F.C. players
Mamelodi Sundowns F.C. players
South African Premier Division players
Olympic soccer players of South Africa
South Africa international soccer players
Soccer players from Gauteng